Serjania is a genus of flowering plants in the soapberry family, Sapindaceae. The name honours French Minim friar Philippe Sergeant.

Selected species

Formerly placed here
 Paullinia cururu L. (as S. cururu (L.) Druce)

References

External links

 
Sapindaceae genera
Taxonomy articles created by Polbot
Taxa named by Philip Miller